The Central Clinic and Hospital is a municipal hospital in Da'an District, Taipei, Taiwan. Its address is 77 Zhongxiao East Road, Section 4.

History
The hospital was established on 1 March 1973.

Transportation
The hospital is within walking distance east from the Zhongxiao Fuxing station of the Taipei Metro.

See also
 Healthcare in Taiwan
 List of hospitals in Taiwan

References 

1973 establishments in Taiwan
Hospitals established in 1973
Hospitals in Taipei
Municipal hospitals